= Cherati (woreda) =

- District
- Country: Ethiopia

Cherati is a district of Somali Region in Ethiopia.
